"You Belong in Rock n' Roll" is a song by Tin Machine, released ahead of their second album in August 1991. The song was the band’s first release on Victory Records, which was distributed by London Records in the UK.

Background and recording
Recorded in 1989 after Tin Machine's first tour, the song spent a year in mixing and overdubs by Reeves Gabrels, who was inspired by Nine Inch Nails' album Pretty Hate Machine (1989), saying that "You Belong in Rock n' Roll" started basically "as a bass song. I wanted to lay in some industrial stuff against it." Gabrels tried using an electric razor to influence the sound of his guitar for the song, but ended up instead using a vibrator that he bought from a local sex store.

The single was launched with a barrage of publicity, including appearances on Top of the Pops, where Gabrels chose to play his guitar with a bread roll, and Wogan, where the band again mimed, and this time Gabrels played his guitar with the vibrator, and David Bowie visibly tired of the host’s patter. The single peaked at UK No. 33 – a disappointment, but it would be Tin Machine’s biggest hit single.

Track listing

7" version
 "You Belong in Rock 'n' Roll" (Bowie, Gabrels) – 3:33
 "Amlapura" (Indonesian version) (Bowie, Gabrels) – 3:49

12"/CD version 1
 "You Belong in Rock n' Roll" (Extended version) (Bowie, Gabrels) – 6:32
 "You Belong in Rock n' Roll" (LP version) (Bowie, Gabrels) – 4:07
 "Amlapura" (Indonesian version) (Bowie, Gabrels) – 3:49
 "Shakin' All Over" (Live) (Kidd) – 2:49

CD version 2
 "You Belong in Rock n' Roll" (Bowie, Gabrels)  – 3:33
 "Amlapura" (Indonesian version) (Bowie, Gabrels) – 3:49
 "Stateside" (H. Sales) – 5:38
 "Hammerhead" (Bowie, H. Sales) – 3:15

Credits and personnel
Producers
 Tin Machine
 Tim Palmer

Musicians
 David Bowie – vocals, guitar, saxophone
 Reeves Gabrels – lead guitar
 Hunt Sales – drums, vocals
 Tony Sales – bass, vocals
 Kevin Armstrong – rhythm guitar

Live versions
 A live version recorded during the 1991 Tin Machine tour was released on the live album Tin Machine Live: Oy Vey, Baby in 1992.

Chart performance

References
 Pegg, Nicholas, The Complete David Bowie, Reynolds & Hearn Ltd, 2000, 

Tin Machine songs
1991 songs
1991 singles
Songs written by David Bowie
Songs written by Reeves Gabrels
London Records singles
Victory Records singles